The Donald L. Conner House is a single-family home located at 2705 Manor Street in Midland, Michigan. It was listed on the National Register of Historic Places in 1989.

History
This house was designed by architect Alden B. Dow for Donald L. Conner in 1936.

Description
The Donald L. Connor House is a small single-story flat-roofed International Style residence located on a long, narrow, sloping corner lot. The front elevation contains a two car garage, framed by the broad fascia. The most noticeable feature of the house is the long trellis walkway, which runs along the side of the house and extends forward well beyond the front plane of the garage.

References

		
National Register of Historic Places in Midland County, Michigan
International style architecture in Michigan
Houses completed in 1936
Alden B. Dow buildings
Midland, Michigan